The Southern Line in Auckland, New Zealand is the name given to suburban train services that operate between Britomart Transport Centre in central Auckland and Pukekohe via Newmarket.

Routing 
From Britomart to Newmarket, Southern Line services use the Newmarket Line, then follow the North Auckland Line to Westfield Junction, and from thence onto the North Island Main Trunk (NIMT) line as far as Pukekohe, the terminus of the Southern Line. In its entirety, this line follows the original 1875 North Island Main Trunk route between central Auckland and Pukekohe.

The line, originally single-tracked, was duplicated, piecemeal, between 1909 and 1939. In 1915, the original single-track Parnell tunnel was bypassed by a twin-track tunnel. The older tunnel can be seen alongside the current one, between Parnell station and Newmarket Junction.

History 
In 1930, the Westfield Deviation opened a new eastern route for the NIMT between Auckland and Westfield via Glen Innes. The route between Auckland and Westfield via Newmarket then ceased to be part of the NIMT. The portion between Newmarket and Westfield became part of the North Auckland Line (NAL), which runs between Westfield and Whangarei.

The Southern Line suburban services continued to run on the older route. A new line, called the Eastern Line, was introduced for services on the new route. While the Eastern and Southern lines have a different route between Auckland and Westfield, they share the same tracks between Westfield and Puhinui station.

Third Main Line 
A future third main line to be built as part of the Wiri to Quay Park project announced in 2017, work on which started in 2020 and is to be completed by 2024. It is expected to ease congestion on Auckland rail lines by allowing "through" trains to pass stationary trains at stations, improve rail freight access from the Port of Auckland to the Westfield yards and allow more frequent passenger and freight services. The new line would be between Westfield and Wiri.

These improvements will avoid an estimated 175,000 annual freight movements on the state highway network. Work began at the end of 2020. The $315 million funding package for these works was announced as part of the Government's New Zealand Upgrade Programme.

New stations 
As part of the New Zealand Upgrade Programme, new stations are to be built at Drury East, Drury West and Paerata.

Electrification 

Along with the rest of Auckland's suburban railway network, the Southern Line was electrified from Britomart to Papakura, with electric services beginning in 2014. Services between Pukekohe and Papakura are still provided by diesel multiple units (DMUs). In 2020, as part of the New Zealand Upgrade Programme, the government announced $371 million in funding to extend electrification from Papakura to Pukekohe. The project is due for completion in 2023.

Services 
Suburban services are operated by Auckland One Rail under the AT Metro brand.

Stations on the line 
Stations in grey are closed or no longer served by the Southern Line.

The following section of unelectrified track is served by a diesel train shuttle service. Papakura is the transfer hub between services.

See also 
 Public transport in Auckland
 List of Auckland railway stations

References 

Railway lines in New Zealand
Public transport in Auckland
Rail transport in Auckland